Joan Fish McCord (August 4, 1930 – 2004) was an American professor of Criminology at Temple University and a recipient of the Herbert Bloch Award from the American Society of Criminology.

Early life
Joan McCord was born as Joan Fish on August 4, 1930 in Manhattan, New York. She graduated from Stanford University with a degree in philosophy in 1952 and did graduate work at Harvard University, followed by a master's degree in education in 1956, also from Harvard University, and then an M.A. in 1966 and a Ph.D. in 1968, both in sociology, from Stanford.

Career

Criminologist
In 1968 she joined the faculty in Drexel University and then moved to Temple University in 1987. In 1989 she became the first female president of the American Society of Criminology. She is particularly known for experimental longitudinal studies of mentoring programs, especially the Cambridge Somerville Youth Study, often showing they had counterintuitive negative effects. Her researched was featured in an episode of Freakanomics, "When Helping Hurts." She also studied the causes of juvenile delinquency, and wrote about alcoholism and psychopathy. She is said to have made unique contributions by merging philosophical thinking with empirical social sciences. In 1996 she was interviewed by The New York Times regarding a rape committed by a 12-year old.

Author
Aside from being a criminologist Joan McCord was known for her editorial work, particularly chapter four of the Cures That Harm which came out in The New York Times in 2002. A volume of her essays on criminology, edited by her son Geoffrey Sayre-McCord, were published postmortem by Temple University Press in 2007.

TV
She also credited for appearing in Scared Straight!, a documentary on juvenile delinquents.

Personal life
Joan McCord was married to her first husband, the sociologist William Maxwell McCord, with whom she had co-authored numerous early books and articles. They had two sons, Geoffrey Sayre-McCord (who resides in Durham, N.C.), and Rob McCord and four grandsons. Her second husband, Carl A. Silver, was a professor at Drexel University. She died from lung cancer in Narberth, Pennsylvania, on February 24, 2004.

References

Further reading

External links
ASC Newsletter 2004

1930 births
2004 deaths
American criminologists
Harvard Graduate School of Education alumni
American women criminologists
Presidents of the American Society of Criminology
Stanford University alumni
Temple University faculty
Drexel University faculty
deaths from lung cancer